Alloclamide (Pectex, Tuselin) is an antitussive and antihistamine drug marketed in Finland and Spain. It has never been marketed in the US.

It is sold as an oral solution, containing 6.25 mg/mL alloclamide. The recommended dosage for adults is 25 mg three to four times daily. Adverse effects include constipation and sedation.

References

Antitussives
Antihistamines
Diethylamino compounds
Chlorobenzenes
Benzamides